Union Sportive Quillan Haute-Vallée or US Quillan is a French rugby union club. The team are currently playing in the Fédérale divisions of French rugby, though they have in the past, made it to the final of the French championship, and won it in 1929. The team was founded in 1898.

Honours
 French championship:
 Champions: 1929
 Runners-up: 1928, 1930

Finals results

French championship

Notable players
 Marcel Baillette
 René Biénès
 Charles Bigot
 Amédée Cutzach
 Joseph Desclaux
 Louis Destarac 
 Jean Galia 
 Eugène Ribère
 Jean-Claude Rouan 
 Marcel Soler
 Henri Pidoux 
 Thierry Février

External links
 Official website
 On Finalesrugby.com

Quillan